Hamad Bin Khalifa University, is a public university located within Education City in Doha, the capital city of Qatar. Hamad Bin Khalifa University (HBKU), a member of Qatar Foundation for Education, Science, and Community Development, was founded in 2010. The university began graduating students in 2014. It was named after Sheikh Hamad bin Khalifa Al Thani, former Emir of Qatar. HBKU is based in Doha's Education City.

Academics
Hamad Bin Khalifa University and its programs were recognized by the Ministry of Education and Higher Education in  Qatar under decree number 34 for year 2017. The university's graduate program focuses include information and computing technologies, life sciences, sustainable development, Islamic studies, Islamic finance, middle eastern studies, translation studies, and law.

HBKU is organized into the following colleges:

College of Islamic Studies (CIS)
College of Humanities and Social Sciences (CHSS)
College of Science and Engineering (CSE)
College of Law (CL)
College of Health and Life Sciences (CHLS)
College of Public Policy (CPP)

Research

HBKU has the following three national research institutes:

 Qatar Environment and Energy Research Institute (QEERI)
 Qatar Biomedical Research Institute (QBRI)
 Qatar Computing Research Institute (QCRI).

HBKU Press
Hamad Bin Khalifa University Press (HBKU Press) is the university publishing house, and offers educational books for schools, academic books for universities and researchers, and information and reference titles that can be accessed online.

HBKU Press has published more than 90 books and houses QScience, an online research and academic platform.

Student body
HBKU currently has over 700 students from over 57 nationalities. 38% of the students are Qatari.

Education City 
Located in Education City, these institutions include Carnegie Mellon University in Qatar; Georgetown University Qatar; HEC Paris in Qatar; Northwestern University in Qatar; Texas A&M University at Qatar; UCL Qatar; Virginia Commonwealth University School of the Arts in Qatar; and Weill Cornell Medical – Qatar.

Buildings 

College of Islamic Studies building
Liberal Arts & Sciences building
HBKU Research Complex
HBKU Headquarters
HBKU Housing and Residence Halls

Notable alumni
 Sheikha Mozah Bint Nasser Al Missned (Class of 2015)

Notable faculty 

 Amal Al-Malki, first Qatari dean at an Education City university
 Aisha Yousef al-Mannai, one of Qatar's first female parliamentarians
 Damilola Sunday Olawuyi, UNESCO Chair on Environmental Law and Sustainable Development

References

Schools in Qatar
2010 establishments in Qatar
Hamad Bin Khalifa University
Educational institutions established in 2010